Russell Lake is a small lake located west-southwest of the hamlet of Rock Rift in Delaware County, New York. Russell Lake drains south via Sands Creek.

See also
 List of lakes in New York

References 

Lakes of New York (state)
Lakes of Delaware County, New York